Buch-Geiseldorf is a former municipality in the district of Hartberg in Styria, Austria.  It was united with Sankt Magdalena am Lemberg on January 1, 2013 to form the new municipality Buch-St. Magdalena in Hartberg-Fürstenfeld District.

References

Cities and towns in Hartberg-Fürstenfeld District